Michèle Martinez (born 6 June 1968) is a French politician from National Rally (RN) who has represented the 4th constituency of Pyrénées-Orientales in the National Assembly since 2022.

References

See also 

 List of deputies of the 16th National Assembly of France

Living people
1968 births
21st-century French politicians
21st-century French women politicians
Women members of the National Assembly (France)
Members of Parliament for Pyrénées-Orientales
Deputies of the 16th National Assembly of the French Fifth Republic
National Rally (France) politicians

People from Perpignan